Bruce Barton (born May 30, 1957) is an American sprint canoeist who competed in the late 1970s. At the 1976 Summer Olympics in Montreal, he was eliminated in the semifinals of K-2 1000 m event and the repechages of the K-4 1000 m event.

Barton's brother, Greg, won four Summer Olympic medals in canoe sprint between 1984 and 1992, including two golds in 1988.

References
Sports-reference.com profile

1957 births
American male canoeists
Canoeists at the 1976 Summer Olympics
Living people
Olympic canoeists of the United States